Michael Joseph Hanley (born November 26, 1954) was the tenth bishop of the Episcopal Diocese of Oregon. He was elected at the diocese's annual convention on November 30, 2009, and was ordained to the episcopate and installed on April 10, 2010.

See also
 List of Episcopal bishops of the United States
 Historical list of the Episcopal bishops of the United States

References

External links
Episcopal Church website biography  
Bishop Michael Hanley, Diocese of Oregon

1954 births
Living people
Place of birth missing (living people)
Episcopal Church in Oregon
Episcopal bishops of Oregon